Miguel Llaneras (born 5 August 1926) was a Cuban basketball player. He competed in the men's tournament at the 1948 Summer Olympics.

References

External links
 

1926 births
Possibly living people
Cuban men's basketball players
Olympic basketball players of Cuba
Basketball players at the 1948 Summer Olympics